Del is a vector differential operator represented by the symbol ∇ (nabla).

Del or DEL can also refer to:

Mathematics
  A name for the partial derivative symbol ∂
  Dynamic epistemic logic

Abbreviations
 DEL or Del, for Delaware, one of the United States
 Del, for the constellation Delphinus
 Del., for a non-voting delegate to the United States House of Representatives

People
 Del (given name), a list of people with the given name or nickname
 Del Shannon, stage name of American rock and country singer-songwriter Charles Weedon Westover (1934–1990)
 Del tha Funkee Homosapien (short for "Delvon"), American hip hop artist
 Del Fontaine (1904–1935), Canadian boxer and convicted murderer born Raymond Henry Bousquet

Fictional characters
 Del Boy, lead character in the BBC comedy series Only Fools and Horses
 Del Dingle, fictional character in the ITV soap opera Emmerdale
 Del, robot alligator villager from the video game series Animal Crossing

Mascots
 Del, one of the mascots of PBS Kids since 2013

Computing
 DEL, Data-Entry Language, predecessor of the Lua programming language
 Del (command), a DOS, OS/2, and Microsoft Windows shell command
 , HTML tags used to mark text for deletion
 Delete character, also known as rubout
 Delete key, abbreviated Del on computer keyboards

Acronyms
 Department for Employment and Learning, part of the Northern Ireland government
 Deutsche Eishockey Liga, the premier ice hockey league in Germany
 DNA Encoded Chemical Library, a technology for the synthesis and screening of collections of chemical compounds

Codes
 DEL, IATA code for Indira Gandhi International Airport, Delhi, India
 del, ISO 639-2 and 639-3 codes for the  Delaware languages of Native Americans

Music
"Del", a song on the album 3rd Eye Vision by Hieroglyphics

See also
 DEL2, the second tier of ice hockey in Germany, below the DEL
 Deel (disambiguation)
 Dell (disambiguation)